Le Pain dur ("hard bread") is a three-act theatre play by French author Paul Claudel, published in 1918 and the second play of La Trilogie des Coûfontaine. The play was performed in Switzerland and Canada by Ludmilla Pitoëff between 1941 and 1943.

Mises-en-scène 
 1949 : André Barsacq, Théâtre de l'Atelier
 1959 : Guy Parigot, Comédie de l'Ouest 
 1962 : Bernard Jenny, Théâtre du Vieux-Colombier
 1969 : Jean-Marie Serreau, Comédie-Française 
 1992 : Claude Yersin, Nouveau théâtre d'Angers 
 1995 : Marcel Maréchal, Théâtre du Rond-Point
 2000 : Frédéric Dussenne, Théâtre des Martyrs (Bruxelles)
 2000 : Dag Jeanneret 
 2002 : Bernard Sobel, Théâtre de Gennevilliers
 2003 : Nicole Gros, Théâtre du Nord-Ouest
 2010 : Agathe Alexis and Alain Alexis Barsacq, Théâtre de l'Atalante

See also 
 L'Otage
 Le Père humilié
 List of works by Paul Claudel

External links 
 Le Pain dur, édition de la NRF, Paris, 1918 le Pain dur on Internet Archive.
 La trilogie des Coûfontaine on paul-claudel.net
  Les Archives du Spectacle

French plays
1918 plays